Gornje Ložine (in older sources also Gorenje Ložine) is a settlement northeast of Kočevje in southern Slovenia. The area is part of the traditional region of Lower Carniola and is now included in the Southeast Slovenia Statistical Region. The settlement includes the site of the former hamlet of Schweinberg at the foot of Jasnica Hill, now occupied by the abandoned Jasnica Recreation and Tourism Center.

History
The Ložine volunteer fire department became a founding unit of the Kočevje municipal fire department on 28 August 1955.

Church
The local church is dedicated to Saints Peter and Paul and belongs to the Parish of Stara Cerkev. It is a 15th-century late Gothic building that was refurbished in the 19th century. The main altar dates to 1861.

References

External links
Gornje Ložine on Geopedia
Pre–World War II list of oeconyms and family names in Gornje Ložine

Populated places in the Municipality of Kočevje